Wola Starogrodzka  is a village in the administrative district of Gmina Parysów, within Garwolin County, Masovian Voivodeship, in east-central Poland.

The village has a population of 632.

References

Wola Starogrodzka